Iván Stalin González Montaño (born 13 November 1980) is a Venezuelan lawyer and politician. On 26 September 2010 he was elected as deputy of the National Assembly for the fifth electoral district of Caracas, he presided the Administration and Services Parliamentary Commission and between 2016 and 2017 he was elected as leader of the MUD opposition fraction. On 2019 he was named second Vice President of the Assembly.

During the 2019 Venezuelan presidential crisis, he has been working as an aide to Juan Guaidó.

References

External links 
Official website

Venezuelan activists
A New Era politicians
Central University of Venezuela alumni
People from Caracas
Pages with unreviewed translations
1980 births
Living people
Movimiento Estudiantil (Venezuela)